Simonetti is an Italian surname. Notable with this surname include:

 Members of the Simonetti family, an Italian noble Banking family with origins in Tuscany, including:
 Annibale Simonetti, Prince, Roman nobleman from nineteenth-century
 Antonio Hercolani Fava Simonetti (1183–1962), member of the Sovereign Military Order of Malta
 Antonio Sanseverino (1477–1543), Italian Roman Catholic cardinal and bishop.
 Claudio Simonetti (born 1952), Brazilian-born Italian musician and film composer
 Fra' Gherardo Hercolani Fava Simonetti (born 1941), Grand Commander of the Order of Malta
 Achille Simonetti (sculptor) (1838–1900), sculptor in Australia
 Alfonso Simonetti (1840–1892), Italian painter, mainly of the Romantic-style
 Attilio Simonetti (1843–1925), Italian painter and Antiquarian
 Carlo Simonetti (1903 – date unknown), Italian modern pentathlete
 Ellen Simonetti (born 1974), former American flight attendant 
 Enrico Simonetti (1924–1978),  Italian pianist, composer, conductor, and television and radio presenter
 Frank Simonetti (born 1962), retired American professional ice hockey defenseman
 Giacomo Simonetti (or Simoneta; 1475–1539), Italian Roman Catholic bishop and cardinal
 Jennifer Simonetti-Bryan, American wine educator, consultant and Master of Wine
 Lenny Simonetti (1919–1973), American football tackle 
 Loredana Simonetti (born 1930), Italian female middle-distance runner
 Manlio Simonetti (1926–2017), Italian scholar of Patristics and the history of Biblical interpretation
 Mauro Simonetti (born 1948), Italian professional road bicycle racer
 Pasquale Simonetti (1926–1955), Italian criminal of the Camorra 
 Ryan Simonetti, American professional skateboarder 
 Vito Simonetti (born 1903), Argentine fencer

See also 
 Simone (surname)
 Simonini (surname)

Italian-language surnames
Patronymic surnames
Surnames from given names